Nitish Bharadwaj (born 2 June 1963) is an Indian television and film actor, director, screenwriter, film and TV programme producer, veterinarian (veterinary surgeon) graduate from Mumbai Veterinary college and former Member of Parliament in Lok Sabha. He is best known for his role as Lord Krishna in B. R. Chopra's television series Mahabharat, as well as for his portrayal of Lord Vishnu and several avatars of Lord Vishnu in some of Chopra's other great works, such as  Vishnu Puran His debut directorial film in Marathi titled Pitruroon has won him accolades from both the audiences and critics and he now focuses on his film career entirely through screenwriting, directing and acting.

Career

Theatre and radio

Before coming into the field of acting, Bharadwaj was a professional veterinary surgeon and had worked as an assistant veterinarian at a Race Course in Mumbai; however, he left the job considering it a monotonous one. He started his arts career with his training in Marathi theatre as a director, under stalwarts such as Sudha Karmarkar, Dr. Kashinath Ghanekar and Prabhakar Panshikar. He then moved on to professional Marathi theatre with Sai Paranjapye and later shifted to Hindi theatre on sound advice from his friend Ravi Baswani. Baswani was instrumental in getting Bharadwaj from Marathi to the nation-wide Hindi arena and Bharadwaj has always acknowledged Baswani's contribution to his life. He worked with a thespian of Hindi theatre named Dinesh Thakur and performed in many of his plays till 1987. He later did a Hindi mythological play Chakravyuh, in which he reappears as Lord Krishna, the role he mastered in the old Mahabharat. Though the play depicts the story of Abhimanyu's martyrdom, it brings out various issues out of the same story which are relevant to today's times. Chakravyuh was one of the most successful plays of Hindi Theatre in 2015 and has already had around 75 showings across India, including some theatre festivals like the Kala Ghoda Festival, Mumbai. Bharadwaj also performed in a musical theatre production titled Moti Roti Patli Chunni (1993), with a renowned theatre in London (UK) named "Theatre Royal Stratford East". This play won the "London Time Out Dance & Performance Award" and toured across Britain and Canada.

Bharadwaj also did 2 radio shows for BBC Radio 4 (London, UK), namely Bhagvad Geeta and Ramayan. He was nominated for the "Sony Radio award" for Ramayan in the UK in 1995.

Television career
In 1988 Bharadwaj was selected to play the lead role of Lord Krishna in B. R. Chopra's classic television series Mahabharat.  He played the role at the age of 23 and became an overnight star. His performance was loved and appreciated by audience. He also did a cameo in the show Buniyaad's episode 51.

He directed a philosophical TV series titled Gita Rahasya, Apraadhi for Star TV and a few documentary films.

In 2000, Bharadwaj appeared in B.R. Chopra's another mythological show Vishnu Puran, where he played role of Lord Vishnu and his various incarnations. In 2001 he played the role of Rama in Chopra's Ramayan with Smriti Malhotra Irani.

Film career 

Bharadwaj starred as the Main Lead in many Marathi movies such as Khatyal Sasu Nathal Soon, Nasheebwan, Anapekshit, Pasanta Ahe Mulgi, Trishagni (with Nana Patekar) and the highly acclaimed Malayalam movie Njan Gandharvan, (1991) directed by P. Padmarajan. After Njan Gandharvan, Padmarajan was planning a film with Mohanlal and Bharadwaj in lead roles, but he died before it could materialise. In a later interview in 2019, Bharadwaj said that, if that film had happened, he might have settled in Kerala. He judged a Marathi dance reality show on ETV Marathi; Jallosh Survanayugacha, with Sudha Chandran and Ramesh Deo.

Bharadwaj made his film direction debut in 2013 with a Marathi film starring Tanuja, Suhas Joshi and Sachin Khedekar titled Pitruroon. The film is based on a novella by Sudha Murthy. The film was acclaimed by both the critics and audiences. Pitruroon received many nominations and awards, and also gave Bharadwaj the  Maharashtra State Film Award as the second Best Director of 2013. Recently in 2020 he appeared on screen as a Sudarshan Chakrapani in a Marathi web series Samantar which was telecasted on mx player. Bharadwaj has also played important roles in movies including Mohenjo Daro and Kedarnath.

Politics
Bharadwaj contested the parliamentary elections from Jamshedpur  in Jharkhand and Rajgarh (in Madhya Pradesh) as a Bharatiya Janata Party (BJP) candidate and was elected to Lok Sabha as a Member of Parliament from Jamshedpur in 1996 election, by defeating veteran Inder Singh Namdhari. He lost to Laxman Singh (brother of then chief minister of Madhya Pradesh, Digvijaya Singh) from Rajgarh constituency in the 1999 Lok Sabha election.
He also worked in BJP's organisational unit of Madhya Pradesh and was also its Spokesperson for a while, till he voluntarily retired from active politics to focus on his film career as a screenwriter & film director.

Early life
Nitish Bharadwaj was born on 2 June 1963 to Janardan C. Upadhye, a Senior Advocate of Bombay High Court and a veteran labour lawyer. He was also a close aide of George Fernandes in the labour movement in the 60s and 70s. Bharadwaj's mother, Sadhana Upadhye, was the Head of the Marathi Literature department of Wilson College, Mumbai. She was an exponent of the Bhagvad Geeta and Dnyaneshwari, the knowledge of which she imparted to Bharadwaj from childhood. He has one younger brother, Rahul Upadhye Bharadwaj.

Personal life

In 1991, Bharadwaj married Monisha Patil, daughter of Vimla Patil, then editor of Femina. They have two children, a son and daughter and divorced in 2005. Monisha now lives in Hounslow, Middlesex with her two children, Arrush and Saayli (now called India). Bharadwaj married Smita Gate, an IAS officer (1992 batch) from Madhya Pradesh cadre, in 2009 and they have twin daughters. The couple separated in September 2019, which was confirmed in January 2022.

Filmography

Acting roles 

 Trishagni (1988) (with Nana Patekar)
 Njan Gandharvan (1991, Malayalam)
 Sangeet (1992) (with Madhuri Dixit)
 Gruhpravesh (1992) (with Nishigandha Wad)
 Prem Daan (1991) (with Khushboo)
 Prem Shakti (1994) (with Govinda, Karishma Kapoor
 Nache Nagin Gali Gali (1991) with Meenakshi Seshadri
 Khatyal Sasu Nathal Soon (1987) with Varsha Usgaonkar
 Pasant Aahe Mulgi (1989) with Varsha Usgaonkar
 Tujhi Majhi Jamli Jodi (1990) with Nivedita Joshi
 Nashibwaan (1988) with Alka Kubal
 Pitruroon (2013) (Writer-Director)
 Mahabharat Aur Barbareek (2013) as Krishna
 Mohenjo Daro (2016) as Durjan (with Hritik Roshan)
 Yaksh (awaiting worldwide release) (title role)
 Kedarnath (2018)as Brijraj Mishra

Television 
 Mahabharat (1988)
 Geeta Rahasya(1999) (producer-Director-Co writer) (with Irrfan Khan)
 Vishnu Puran (2003)
 Ramayan (2003) with Smriti Irani as Seeta
 Man Mein Hai Visshwas (2006-2007, presenter)
 Ajab Gajab Ghar Jamai (2014, Krishna)

Web series 

 Samantar - in as Sudarshan Chakrapani (MX Player Originals) (2020)
 Samantar season 2 - in as Sudarshan Chakrapani (MX Player Originals) (2021)

Awards

 Best Screenplay Writer for Marathi feature film, Pitruroon, Sahyadri Film Awards, 2014
Nominated - Best Actor for Pitruroon, Screen Awards, 2014
 2nd Best Director for Pitruroon, Maharashtra State Film Awards, 2014

See also 

 List of Indian television actors

References

External links
 
 
 

Indian male television actors
Living people
Male actors in Hindi cinema
India MPs 1996–1997
Indian television presenters
Lok Sabha members from Jharkhand
Indian actor-politicians
1963 births
Bharatiya Janata Party politicians from Jharkhand